Tircoed forest village is a suburb between the villages of Penllergaer and Pontlliw, Swansea, Wales. It is part of the Pontlliw and Tircoed community.

Built from the late 1980s onwards, Tircoed currently consists of 470 houses clustered around a village hall, pond and green, accessible from the A48 via a  road. The village has its own local community radio station - Radio Tircoed.

The population in 2011 was around 884 people.

The village is located in the Pontlliw and Tircoed electoral ward of Swansea.

Notes

External links
Tircoed Forest Village information now hosted on Radio Tircoed site.

Villages in Swansea